White bryony may refer to:

Bryonia alba, found in Europe and northern Iran
Bryonia dioica, also known as red bryony